The Belgian Entertainment Association (BEA) is the organization that represents the interests of the music, video and video game industries in Belgium. It was founded in February 2008, when three organizations merged, namely IFPI Belgium, the local chapter of the International Federation of the Phonographic Industry (IFPI), which represented the music industry, the Belgian Video Federation, which represented the video industry, and the Belgian Luxembourg Interactive Software Association, which represented the video game industry. BEA is listed as the local record industry association in Belgium by the IFPI.

Sales charts

The publication of sales charts in Belgium is done through Ultratop, a non-profit organization created BEA. Due to the cultural differences in Belgium, separate charts are published for the Dutch-speaking Flanders region and the French-speaking Wallonia region. In Flanders the most important charts are the Ultratop 50 singles and the Ultratop 50 albums. In Wallonia the most important charts are the Ultratop 40 singles.

Certifications
Through Ultratop, BEA certifies albums, singles and DVDs. Since 2016 for singles, and since July 2017 for albums, the Ultratop charts also include streaming, and this practice is also in effect for certifications. The exact number of streams that are counted as a single or an album is undisclosed. In order to avoid inflation of album sales through raising the number of tracks, only the twelve most streamed tracks are counted. To avoid the effect of one-hit wonders, the two most streamed tracks are counted at the average of the next ten tracks.

Albums 
The current thresholds for albums, in effect since the inclusion of streams in July 2017, are 10,000 units for Gold album and 20,000 for Platinum. Prior to that, the thresholds distinguished between local, French or Dutch speaking albums ("domestic"), and international or non French or Dutch speaking ones ("international"). Since May 2007, the thresholds for domestic albums were 10,000 units for Gold and 20,000 for Platinum, the same as they are currently, while the international repertoire the threshold for Gold was 15,000 units and the threshold for Platinum was 30,000. Previous to that, the thresholds were 15,000/30,000 for domestic repertoire and 25,000/50,000 for international repertoire. Jazz and Classical repertoire shares the thresholds with the domestic repertoire.

Singles 
The current thresholds for domestic singles are 10,000 units for Gold and 20,000 for Platinum, while the levels for international singles are 20,000/40,000, respectively. The international levels were set in July 2018, following the sudden increase in single awards due to the inclusion of streaming. Prior to that, the levels for international singles were the same as the ones for domestic ones, i.e., 10,000 units for Gold and 20,000 for Platinum. The newer levels are applied retroactively, as long as the single was not previously certified.

The thresholds prior to the inclusion of streaming followed the thresholds for albums, i.e., 10,000/20,000 for domestic singles and 15,000/30,000 for international. Based on the IFPI 2009 report, these levels were in effect from mid-2009., however, the change from the older levels, 15,000/30,000 for domestic repertoire and 25,000/50,000 for international repertoire, succeeded the levels change of albums in May 2007, as these levels are still listed by the October 2007 IFPI report.

DVDs
The thresholds for DVDs distinguish between Belgian products sold in one locality, Belgian products sold nationwide, and foreign products. For Belgian-local products, the thresholds are 7,500 units for Gold, 15,500 units for Platinum and 25,500 units for Diamond. For Belgian-nationwide products, the thresholds are 15,000 units for Gold, 30,000 units for Platinum and 50,000 units for Diamond. For foreign products, the thresholds are 25,000 units for Gold, 50,000 units for Platinum and 100,000 units for Diamond.

Archive
An archive of past certifications going back to 1997 is available on the Ultratop website.

List of certified albums
The following is a list of albums that have been certified by the Belgian Entertainment Association.

Gold

2
9
10
15 jaar - De 60 grootste hits!
15 jaar hits
15 - The Very Best Of
100%
À la poursuite du bonheur
Adya Classic 3
Ali e radici
Anastacia
Anja - Ninja
Aphrodite
Aria: The Opera Album
As I Am
Babel
B'Day
Blonde
Bonjour l'amour
Bounce
By the Way
Calma apparente
Ceremonials
Christmas
Christoff & vrienden 2
Circus
Coexist
Collected
Dark Sky Island
Dangerously in Love
De l'amour
De zanger & de muzikant
D'elles
Des jours & des lunes
Dichtbij
El Camino
En route
Escape
Evenwicht
Des mots qui sonnent
F.C. De Kampioenen 2 - Jubilee general!
Faders Up 2 - Live In Amsterdam
Fallen Empires
Fever
Fifty Shades of Grey
Fijación Oral Vol. 1
Following Sea
Frank
From the Cradle
Génération Goldman
Greatest Hits
Greatest Hits
GRRR!
Here I Stand
Het beste en tot nog eens
I Dreamed a Dream
Ik ben een zanger
In Rainbows
In The Lonely Hour
Interstellaires
Jij en ik
Keeps Gettin' Better: A Decade of Hits
Kerstmis met jou
L'attente
Le best of 2012
Le cose che vivi
Le franc Belge
Lequel de nous
Les bénéfices du doute
Les grands moments - Best Of
Liefde & muziek
Liefde voor muziek
Loved Me Back to Life
...Little Broken Hearts
Live In Las Vegas: A New Day…
Lungs
Mezmerize (album)
Mi Sangre
Mini World
Miracle (Celine Dion album)
Me and Mr. Johnson
Millésimes
Mon cœur avait raison
Music for Men
Noi
NRJ Music Awards 2010
Ô filles de l'eau
Old Ideas
One Heart
Oral Fixation Vol. 2
Our Version Of Events
Overdrive
Overpowered
Paramount
Paris
PCD
Perfetto
Pictures
Pilgrim
Prismophonic
Pulse
Purpose
Random Access Memories
Rated R
Rats
Reason
Recovery
Rise and Fall, Rage and Grace
Rock or Bust
Romantique
Resta in ascolto
Safety First
Slowhand at 70 (DVD)
Someone to Watch Over Me
Songs in A Minor
Soul 2
Sorry For Party Rocking
Spirit
Statues
Supposed Former Infatuation Junkie
Taking Chances
The 2nd Law
The Best of Laura Pausini: E ritorno da te
The Breeze: An Appreciation of JJ Cale
The Cream of Clapton
The Essential Elvis Presley
The Greatest Hits
The Heart of Everything
The House
The Katie Melua Collection
The Remix
The Silent Force
The Ultimate Collection
The Very Best of Enya
The Whole Story
Unapologetic
Undercover
Ultimate Collection
Ultimate Santana
Under My Skin
VH1 Divas Live
Vise le ciel ou Bob Dylan revisité
Wereld vol kleuren
With Orchestra Live
Working on a Dream
X
xx
Zingt Adamo

Platinum

#1
1 fille & 4 types
2010: Les Enfoirés... la crise de nerfs!
A Curious Thing
A Head Full of Dreams
Altijd onderweg
Amarantine
And Winter Came...
Au cœur du Stade
Back to Back
Back to Basics
Believe
Best Of - 3 CD
Birdy
Blackstar
Born This Way
Born to Die
Breakaway
Bringing the World the Madness
Britney
Chambre 12
Chambre avec vue
Chaleur humaine
Cœur de pirate
Comme à la maison
Country Man
Crush
Doo-Wops & Hooligans
Dromen durven delen
Duizend spiegels
e²
En route
Encore un soir
Engeltjes
Ensemble
Face A / Face B
Forty Licks
Freak of Nature
Frozen
Funhouse
Ghost Rockers
Ghost Stories
!
Going Back
Greatest Hits
I Am... Sasha Fierce
If You Wait
In extremis
In This Light and On This Evening
Invincible
It's Not Me, It's You
J.Lo
Junior Eurosong 2011
Junior Eurosong 2012
Keep You Close
Kendji
King of Pop
L'Apogée
Laundry Service
Legend
Lioness: Hidden Treasures
Live à Paris
My Love: Essential Collection
Loud
Lys & Love
Making Mirrors
Monkey Me
Mylo Xyloto
No Line On The Horizon
Nothing but the Beat
On ne change pas
Op de groei
Piece by Piece
Private Investigations
Quelqu'un m'a dit
Random Access Memories
Reality Killed The Video Star
Rouge ardent
Sans attendre
So Far So Good
Sounds of the Universe
Stay Gold
Stilelibero
Ten
Thank You All!
The Best of Me
The Eminem Show
The Gift
The Platinum Collection
The Resistance
The Soul Sessions
These Are Special Times
Tout et son contraire
U218 Singles
Up to Now
Watermark
With Orchestra

Multi-platinum

Two times

19
A Day Without Rain
A Rush of Blood to the Head
Black Ice
Bretonne
Des roses & des orties
Duetten
Entity
Eros
Good Girl Gone Bad
Hybrid Theory
Intensive Care
Les Mots
Loose
Metallica
On trace la route
One Love
Only by the Night
Parachutes
Paint the Sky with Stars
Rockferry
Romanza
Shepherd Moons
Soul
S'il suffisait d'aimer
The Best of 1990–2000
The Broken Circle Breakdown
The Colour of My Love
Map of the soul: Persona
The Fame
The Fame Monster
This Is It
This Is the Life
Tous les rêves ... 
Unplugged
X&Y

Three times

All the Way... A Decade of Song
...Baby One More Time
Back to Bedlam
Back to Black
Buena Vista Social Club
Cheese
Greatest Hits
MaMaSé!
MTV Unplugged In New York
Music
Oops!...I Did It Again
Quinze ans d'amour - Best Of
The Best Of
The E.N.D
Viva la Vida or Death and All His Friends
Zaz

Four times

Falling into You
Hits
Let's Talk About Love
Samedi soir sur la terre
Selah Sue
Story

Five times
Clouseau 20
Liefde voor publiek
Life In Cartoon Motion
Ushuaia
Spice
Spiceworld

Six times
21
The Best of 1980–1990
D'eux

Seven times
Gold: Greatest Hits

Eight times
25
10.000 luchtballonnen

Twelve times
Racine carrée

See also
 List of music recording certifications
 Music Industry Awards, Flemish music prizes awarded by the VRT in collaboration with Music Centre Flanders

References

External links
 

Organizations established in 2008
Music organisations based in Belgium
Music industry associations
2008 establishments in Belgium